Francesco Di Giacomo ( 22 August 194721 February 2014) was an Italian singer and lyricist. He was the lead vocalist of the progressive rock band Banco del Mutuo Soccorso from 1971 to 2013.

Life and career
Born in La Caletta, a frazione of Siniscola, at 5 years old Di Giacomo moved to Rome with his family. He knew keyboardist Vittorio Nocenzi during the 1971 , and they formed the progressive rock band Banco del Mutuo Soccorso, which made its recording debut one year later, getting critical acclaim and commercial success. Di Giacomo served as lead vocalist as well as lyricist for most of the group's repertoire. Besides his musical career, he played bit parts in Federico Fellini's films Fellini Satyricon, Roma and Amarcord.

He died on 21 February 2014 in a car accident. His solo album La parte migliore was released posthumously in 2019.

References

External links

 
 

1947 births
2014 deaths
People from the Province of Nuoro
Italian singer-songwriters
Italian lyricists
Road incident deaths in Italy